The Chinese Elm cultivar Ulmus parvifolia 'State Fair' was cloned from a tree growing in the grounds of the Oklahoma State Fair, Oklahoma City.

Description
The tree is distinguished by its orbicular crown, dense foliage and attractive exfoliating bark.

Pests and diseases
The species and its cultivars are highly resistant, but not immune, to Dutch elm disease, and unaffected by the Elm Leaf Beetle Xanthogaleruca luteola.

Cultivation
Listed originally by the Sunshine Nursery, Clinton, Oklahoma, in 1994, it is not known to be in cultivation beyond North America.

Accessions
None known.

References

Chinese elm cultivar
Ulmus articles missing images
Ulmus